Hinduism is a minority religion in Cuba. Hinduism is followed by 0.2% of the population of Cuba. ISKCON also has a presence in the country.

Demographics

In 2007, Cuba had about 23,927 Hindus.

References

External Links 

Hinduism in Cuba